Cristino García Granda (6 March 1914 – 21 February 1946) was a fighter with the French Resistance in France during World War II. He was born in Gozón, Asturias, Spain and was executed by the Francoist regime.

Highly successful in fighting the German occupiers (he took part in the Battle of Madeleine and in the attack of the prison in Nîmes), at the end of the war, he returned to Spain to work with Resistance groups (Spanish Maquis) to oust caudillo Francisco Franco. Captured on 15 October 1945, he was tortured and was executed by firing squad on 21 February 1946.

The  in Aubervilliers, Île-de-France, was also named after him.

References 

1914 births
1946 deaths
French Resistance members
People from Gozón
Spanish people of the Spanish Civil War (Republican faction)
People executed by Francoist Spain
People executed by Spain by firing squad
Executed Spanish people
Burials in Spain